Prestongrange is a place in East Lothian, Scotland, United Kingdom, situated between Musselburgh to the west, and Prestonpans to the east.

The place name derives from "Preston", meaning "priest's town", and a grange (or granary) which was worked by the Cistercian monks of Newbattle Abbey.

In the early 17th century, Mark Ker took possession of the lands from the abbey, and after the Grant Suttie family took over, the Prestongrange Colliery was no longer productive and fell into disuse.

In 1830, Sir George Grant Suttie leased Prestongrange Colliery to Matthias Dunn, the Inspector of Mines.

Prestongrange House

This fine mansion-house was partly rebuilt by Mark Kerr and Helen Leslie. It passed through marriage to John Morison of Saughton Hall around 1600. Laters owners included Alexander Morison, Lord Prestongrange who extended it in 1620. In the early 19th century it was greatly extended by the architect William Henry Playfair.

See also
Prestongrange Industrial Heritage Museum
Prestongrange House, now the headquarters of the Royal Musselburgh Golf Club
Prestongrange Parish Church
William Grant, Lord Prestongrange
List of places in East Lothian

References

External links

 Prestongrange House, by Sonia Baker
 Prestoungrange Online website
 Prestongrange Community Archaeology Project
 Prestongrange Parish Church website
 Prestongrange Bowling & Social Club website

Villages in East Lothian